The Winning Team is a 1952 biographical film directed by Lewis Seiler. It is a fictionalized biography of the life of major league pitcher Grover Cleveland Alexander (1887–1950) starring Ronald Reagan as Alexander, Doris Day as his wife, Aimee, and Frank Lovejoy as baseball star Rogers Hornsby.

It includes his heroic performance in three games in the 1926 World Series against the New York Yankees, where the 7th inning strikeout of Tony Lazzeri is used as the game-ending, Series-winning pitch.

The film earned an estimated $1.7 million at the North American box office in 1952.

Plot

This movie starts with "Alex" (Ronald Reagan) working as a telephone lineman in Elba, Nebraska. While  speaking with his boss, a man comes up to them and lets them know that there is an exhibition baseball game between the local farmers and those of a minor league baseball team. Grover Cleveland Alexander "Alex" runs to where that game is taking place.

The scene switches to where his fiancée Aimee (Doris Day) is talking with her father. Her father does not have a very good opinion of Alex because he is more interested in baseball than in farming. He is worried for his daughter's future.

The game between the farmers and the team is a betting place. Many come to see this game and they know that with Alex pitching they can't lose. Alex strikes out everyone in this game. When he wins the game he returns home.

Aimee is at home waiting for Alex. Aimee's father offers to put a down payment on a farm for his daughter. After a small argument Aimee switches to her father's side and promises that Alex will not play baseball.

Now we go forward to a Church meeting where an invited guest was to show film shots of his recent journey to Norway. As he begins his presentation the first film is upside down and way out of focus. He begins to speak about that film once it has been fixed to the screen when a noise is heard. It is the sound of a backfiring automobile. The car drives up to the front door of the chapel. The driver gets out and opens the door which causes the light from outside to blur out the picture on the screen. Then the driver announces that he is looking for Alex. After walking from the back of the chapel to the front, he finally sees Alex and asks him to come outside with him, where he asks Alex if he can really pitch like he did at the earlier game or was it a fluke.
The next scene shows Alex pitching to this driver who is the manager of the team he beat. Aimee is shown inside and listening to the presentation which is now interrupted by the sound of a ball hitting a glove over and over again. Alex is offered fifty dollars a month if he will consider playing for his team. Alex agrees to play and is shown playing baseball with the new team, the Galesburg Boosters. He sends a baseball card with his picture along with money on a regular basis so he can buy the farm for him and his fiancée.

During one of the games Alex gets on base after being walked. When the next batter makes a hit Alex runs toward second base. The second baseman catches the ball to get Alex out and then throws the ball to first base but it hits Alex in the head. He wakes up three days later in the hospital with Aimee and his mother by his side. The injury ends his 1909 season of baseball.

During the off season between 1909 and 1910 he now has enough money to buy that farm and to marry Aimee. After arriving at the farm he goes out back while his wife is changing and starts chucking mud balls at a fence. His eyes are out of whack and he sees everything in double. He hires a catcher to catch for him and he is always just a bit off because of his eyesight.

In 1910 he returns to baseball after he wakes up one morning and his eyes are perfect again.  His record during that year is 29-11 playing for the Syracuse Stars in the class B New York State League. Then he is sold to the Philadelphia Phillies for 750 dollars.

The scene turns to what Doris Day is known for. The scene is a Christmas at the farm where the family is gathered around and Aimee sings. The movie returns to baseball.

The first game with the Phillies is the 1911 City Series. He throws five innings of no-hit, no-run baseball.  His official Major League baseball debut is on April 15 of that year. During one game he is facing Rogers Hornsby. The catcher passes on a tidbit of info that if Hornsby strikes out he will be booted off the team. Alex tells the catcher what the next pitches will be and Hornsby is able to connect with one of them.

Alex spends most of 1918 in France as a Sergeant with a Field Artillery unit where he is exposed to mustard gas, and a shell that explodes near him causes partial hearing loss as well as epileptic seizures. He has also developed a drinking problem. He returns to the states and continues pitching in 1919.
  
He is traded from Philadelphia to Chicago and pitches for the Cubs during the 1920 season where he wins the pitching triple crown. While playing a Game at Forbes Field his hearing problem returns.  In the sixth inning while on the mound, Alex falls down and his teammates carry him off the field.  It turns out to be an epileptic seizure.

Alex's doctor tells him that if he wants to live he should probably go back to farm life. Alex will not hear of that. He tells the doctor that he really does not want his wife Aimee to know.

As Alex is walking down the street, he passes a bar and the doorman recognizes him and invites him in for a drink "on the house." He becomes totally inebriated. As he lays his head down into his arm a customer is seen walking to a telephone booth. He asks for the sports desk and tells the person who answers that he knows why Alex fell at the ballgame today: "He's a lush." The papers are filled with stories of the drinking problems of Alex. The scene changes to a baseball game where Alex fields a ball and basically throws it away to the first basemen. He is removed from the game.

Alex is next shown where drinking seems to be his new pastime. He is shown stumbling down an alley and then falls as he reaches the end. He is removed from the Cubs and sent to a team playing for the House of David. All this time his wife is trying to find him because she lost track of where he was.

Aimee is finally told where "Alexander the Great" is. He is now a main headliner at a circus. He is touted as the man who can answer all your questions about baseball - and specifically about pitching. Aimee buys a ticket, but when he comes out from the rear of the tent she hides. He spews out many facts and figures about his own career and then asks if anyone has any questions. Aimee leaves without contacting him.

When Aimee does get in touch with him she tells him that she knows of his medical conditions. He is contacted by his old friend Rogers Hornsby, at the request of Aimee, and is offered a pitching job with the St. Louis Cardinals.

We are now taken to the World Series of 1926 when the St. Louis Cardinals and the New York Yankees are squaring off. Alex pitches the second and the sixth games of the series and they win both of them. At the conclusion of the sixth game Alex and Aimee have a conversation in the tunnel of the stadium. It is here when she learns that he looks to her for strength while pitching during this season. He also tells her that she looks tired because he has relied on her so much.

The Cardinals tie up the series at 3-3. It is now the seventh game. Aimee is not at the stadium because she is packing their stuff for a vacation that will start as soon as the game is over. Alex is not expected to pitch today at all. It is a close game. They are at Sportsman's Park in St. Louis and in the seventh inning the pitcher of record has allowed the bases to be loaded. Player-manager Rogers Hornsby pulls the pitcher. He gets a message to the bullpen for Alex to come out and pitch them out of the mess. When Alex gets to the mound he looks and finds that Aimee is not there. Aimee is ready to call for a taxi when she reads on the ticker-tape board across the street that her husband has now been called on to pitch. She has the bellhop at the curb get her a taxi right away so she can get to the stadium.

While she is in traffic Alex is pitching to this batter without her as his rock. He pitches out of the inning and Aimee arrives at the stadium before the ninth inning. She sits in her chair and he sees her. The Cardinals win the series.

Cast
 Ronald Reagan as Grover Cleveland Alexander
 Doris Day as Aimee Alexander 
 Frank Lovejoy as Rogers Hornsby
 Eve Miller as Margaret Killefer 
 James Millican as Bill Killefer
 Russ Tamblyn as Willie Alexander 
 Gordon Jones as George Glasheen 
 Hugh Sanders as Joe McCarthy
 Frank Ferguson as Sam Arrants 
 Walter Baldwin as Pa Alexander 
 Dorothy Adams as Ma Alexander 
 Bob Lemon as Jesse 'Pop' Haines
 Jerry Priddy as Ballplayer 
 Peanuts Lowrey as Ballplayer 
 George Metkovich as Ballplayer

See also
 Ronald Reagan films

References

External links
 
 
 
 

1952 films
1950s biographical drama films
1950s sports films
American baseball films
American biographical drama films
Biographical films about sportspeople
American black-and-white films
Films directed by Lewis Seiler
Films scored by David Buttolph
Films set in the 1920s
Films set in the 1910s
Sports films based on actual events
Warner Bros. films
Cultural depictions of baseball players
1952 drama films
1950s English-language films
1950s American films